Over There is a 1917 American silent war drama film directed by James Kirkwood and starring Charles Richman, Anna Q. Nilsson and Walter McGrail. It was made as a pro-war portrayal of the American Expeditionary Force in World War I and took its name from the popular song Over There.

Cast
 Charles Richman as Montgomery Jackson 
 Anna Q. Nilsson as Bettie Adams 
 Walter McGrail
 Gertrude Berkeley
 Walter Hiers
 Veta Searl
 James A. Furey

References

Bibliography
 Diane M. T. North. The State and the People: California During the First World War. University of California, Davis, 2001.

External links

1917 films
1910s war drama films
American war drama films
Films directed by James Kirkwood Sr.
American silent feature films
American World War I films
American black-and-white films
Selznick Pictures films
1917 drama films
1910s English-language films
1910s American films
Silent American drama films
Silent war drama films